The Ordnance ML 3-inch mortar was the United Kingdom's standard mortar used by the British Army from the early 1930s to the late 1960s, superseding the Stokes mortar. Initially handicapped by its short range compared to similar Second World War mortars, improvements of the propellant charges enabled it to be used with great satisfaction by various armies of the British Empire and of the Commonwealth.

Design 
The ML 3-inch mortar is a conventional Stokes-type mortar that is muzzle-loaded and drop-fired. It also reuses many of the Brandt mortar features.

History 

Based on their experience in the First World War, the British infantry sought some sort of artillery for close support. The initial plan was for special batteries of artillery, but the cost was prohibitive and the mortar was accepted instead.

The Mark II mortar (Mark I was the Stokes) was adopted by the British Army in the early 1930s; and this was the standard British mortar when the Second World War broke out in September 1939. Experience in the early part of the war showed that, although the Mark II was reliable and sturdy, it did not have sufficient range compared to the German 81 mm s.GW.34 mortar. A series of experiments and trials using new propellants improved the range from 1600 yards to 2800 yards by about 1942; and, by 1943, the barrel, baseplate and sights had also been improved. Although called the '3-inch mortar' by the British Army, its calibre was actually .

The ML 3-inch mortar was carried on three packs by infantry or on Universal Carriers.

The Mark II remained in service with the British Army until replaced by the L16 81mm mortar in 1965.

Modifications 
The Canadian Army modified some of its 3-inch mortars, lengthening them to increase their range. This modification was abandoned as it was considered too heavy. 

The Australian Army, for its part, shortened the barrel for use in jungle.

Users 

 : used by the anti-Soviet insurgents in the 1980s
 
 
 
 
 
 
 
 
  (1944–1946)
 
 
 
 Myanmar Army : Inherited from British-Burma Army and also bought from India.Main Medium mortar used till 1970s.
 
 
 
 
 : Polish Armed Forces in the West
 
 
 
 : Used by Yugoslavian Partisans

See also 
 Stokes mortar : British WWI predecessor
 List of infantry mortars

Weapons of comparable role, performance and era 
 8 cm Granatwerfer 34 – German WWII equivalent
 82-BM-37 & 82-PM-41 – Soviet WWII equivalents
 Brandt Mle 27/31 – French WWII equivalent
 M1 mortar – US WWII equivalent
 Type 97 81 mm infantry mortar – Japanese WWII equivalent

Gallery

References

Footnotes

Bibliography 
 
 
 Boyd, David, British Mortars of the Second World War, www.wwiiequipment.com.au, retrieved 23 October 2016.
 War Office, Handbook for the Ordnance, M.L 3-Inch Mortar, Mark II, on Mounting, 3-inch Mortar, Mark I Land Service 1937, His Majesty's Stationery Office, London, 1937.
 War Office, Army Council, Small Arms Training, Volume I, Pamphlet No. 9, Mortar (3-inch) 1939, His Majesty's Stationery Office, London, 1937.
 War Office, Army Council, Small Arms Training, Volume I, Pamphlet No. 9, Amendment No.1, Mortar (3-inch) 1943, His Majesty's Stationery Office, London, 1937.

Mortars of the United Kingdom
World War II infantry mortars of the United Kingdom
81mm mortars
Weapons of the Philippine Army
Military equipment introduced in the 1930s